Marcel Ongenae (3 July 1934 – 8 October 2014) was a Belgian racing cyclist. He rode in the 1962 Tour de France.

References

1934 births
2014 deaths
Belgian male cyclists
Place of birth missing